Folcuin ( 935 – 16 September 990) was a monk at the abbey of Saint-Bertin, where he was a deacon and archivist, and later abbot of Lobbes. He wrote histories of the abbots of both his monasteries.

The Gesta abbatum Sithiensium (Deeds of the Abbots of Saint-Bertin) is a combination of chronicle and cartulary. Folcuin incorporates numerous charters from the abbey's archives into his historical narrative, which begins with the abbey's foundation around 650 and continues to 961/2. It was composed at the request of the lay abbot, Adalolf.

Folcuin also wrote the Gesta abbatum Lobiensium (Deeds of the Abbots of Lobbes).

References

930s births
990 deaths
Abbots of Lobbes
10th-century Latin writers
10th-century French writers